Martin Sauer may refer to:

 Martin Sauer (rowing) (born 1982), German Olympic rower
 Martin Sauer (explorer), English explorer for Russia